The Roger Y. Williams House, also known as the Swanner House, at 29991 Camino Capistrano in San Juan Capistrano, California, was built in 1923.  It was listed on the National Register of Historic Places in 2007.  The listing included two contributing buildings and a contributing structure, plus agricultural fields.

It includes a two-story Craftsman house, a matching watertower, and a matching garage, all built in 1923.

References

		
National Register of Historic Places in Orange County, California
Houses completed in 1923
Houses in California